Bacha Khan is an alternate name for Abdul Ghaffar Khan, a Pashtun political leader.

Bacha Khan may also refer to:

 Bacha Khan (Afghan politician), appointed Governor of Paktia Province, see 2002 in Afghanistan
 Bacha Khan (Guantanamo captive 529), see Timeline of the release and transfer of Guantanamo Bay detainees
 Pacha Khan Zadran, regional militia leader who rose against the Taliban in 2001, was considered a "renegade" in 2003, and was elected to the Wolesi Jirga in 2004
 Bacha Khan International Airport, an international airport in Peshawar, Khyber Pakhtunkhwa, Pakistan
 Bacha Khan University, a public university in Charsadda, Khyber Pakhtunkhwa, Pakistan 
 Bacha Khan Medical College, a public medical institution in Mardan, Khyber Pakhtunkhwa, Pakistan